William John Edmunds  is a British epidemiologist, and a professor in the Faculty of Epidemiology and Population Health at the London School of Hygiene & Tropical Medicine.

Education
Edmunds studied at Imperial College London where he was awarded a PhD in 1994 for research investigating the epidemiology of hepatitis B. He also has an MSc from the University of York.

Career and research
Edmunds specialises in the design of control programmes against infectious diseases, including chlamydia, the 2009 swine flu pandemic, the HPV vaccine, and the Western African Ebola virus epidemic. In 2009, he established the annual online Flusurvey project to track the extent and evolution of UK seasonal influenza.

Edmunds is a member of the New and Emerging Respiratory Virus Threats Advisory Group (NERVTAG), and one of more than 50 attendees of the Scientific Advisory Group for Emergencies (SAGE) advising the UK government on the COVID-19 pandemic.

In a March 2020 interview early in the UK COVID-19 epidemic, Edmunds said that the outbreak "could be very serious ... much more serious than we've had for many years". He has also emphasised both the difficulties in maintaining social distancing over extended time periods, and the key role of herd immunity, saying "The only way to stop this epidemic is indeed to achieve herd immunity". During the loosening of UK lockdown measures in early June 2020, Edmunds said he believed a delay in implementing measures in March "cost a lot of lives", but noted that the data available then was "really quite poor",  making decisions difficult. This position on delay led to direct clashes with politician Matt Hancock, the serving Secretary of State for Health and Social Care.

Other activities
 Coalition for Epidemic Preparedness Innovations (CEPI), Member of the Scientific Advisory Board

Recognition
Edmunds was appointed an Officer of the Order of the British Empire (OBE) in the 2016 New Year Honours, "for services to infectious disease control particularly the Ebola crisis response in West Africa". He was elected a Fellow of the Academy of Medical Sciences (FMedSci) in 2018.

References

Academics of the London School of Hygiene & Tropical Medicine
British epidemiologists
Living people
Fellows of the Academy of Medical Sciences (United Kingdom)
Year of birth missing (living people)
Place of birth missing (living people)
Officers of the Order of the British Empire